Wasden is a surname. Notable people with the surname include:

Kevin Wasden, American science fiction and fantasy artist, illustrator, and comics artist
Lawrence Wasden (born 1957), American lawyer and politician

See also
Walden (name)